The Universities at Shady Grove began in 1992 as part of the University of Maryland University College. In 2000, it reformed under its present name. Daytime, evening and weekend classes are offered at Shady Grove to students studying in 80 undergraduate, graduate, degree and certificate programs.

Established in 2000, The Universities at Shady Grove (USG) is a regional higher education center of the University System of Maryland that offers students access to undergraduate and graduate degree programs from nine universities on one campus in Rockville, Maryland.

There is no separate application for USG; prospective students seeking to enroll in a program at USG apply directly to the university offering their desired program. Students are taught by the same professors, take the same courses, and have the same curriculum as students enrolled in that program at their university's main campus. Students take their classes at USG, but earn their degree from the university offering their program.

There is an on-campus library, the Shannon and Michael Priddy Library.

Academics 
As a regional higher education center of the University System of Maryland, undergraduate and graduate degree programs are offered on the USG campus from nine Maryland universities:

Bowie State University
Ed.D in Education
M.Ed in Education
Salisbury University
B.S. in Exercise Science
M.S. in Applied Health Physiology
B.F.A. in Art, Graphic Design 
Towson University
 B.S. in Early Childhood Education
 B.S. in Elementary Education/Special Education
M.A.T. in Special Education
 M.Ed. in Early Childhood Education
 M.Ed. in Special Education
University of Baltimore
 B.S. in Health Systems Management
 B.S. in Simulation and Game Design
M.A. in Integrated Design
M.P.A. in Public Administration
M.P.S. in Justice Leadership and Management
M.S. in Forensic Science - High Technology Crime
M.S. in Health Systems Management
Doctor of Public Administration
 Graduate Certificate in Government Financial Management
University of Maryland, Baltimore
B.S. in nursing (RN-to-BSN)
B.S. in nursing (Traditional Option)
M.S. in Medical Cannabis Science and Therapeutics
M.S. in Pharmaceutical Sciences
Masters in Social Work
Doctor of Nursing Practice | Family Nurse Practitioner
University of Maryland, Baltimore County
B.A. in History
B.A. in Political Science
B.A. in Psychology
B.A. in Social Work
B.S. in Translational Life Science Technology
M.P.S. in Biotechnology
 M.P.S. in Cybersecurity
 M.P.S. in Data Science
 M.P.S. in Geographic Information Systems
 M.P.S. in I/O Psychology
 M.P.S. in Technical Management
University of Maryland, College Park
 B.A. in Communication
 B.A. in Criminology and Criminal Justice
 B.S. in Accounting
 B.S. in Biological Sciences
 B.S. in Information Science (BSIS)
 B.S. in Management
 B.S. in Marketing
 B.S. in Public Health Science
 M.Ed. in Human Development
 M.Ed. in Math Education: Special Studies in Middle School Math
 M.Ed. in Special Education/Severe Disabilities with a focus on Autism Spectrum Disorders for Teachers, Professionals, and Professional Staff
 M.Ed. in Teacher Leadership: Special Studies in STEM Education
 Master of Business Administration
 Master of Information Management (MIM)
 Master of Library and Information Science (MLIS)
 Professional Master in Engineering
 Graduate Certificate in Engineering (GCEN)
 Post Baccalaureate Certificate in Global Health
University of Maryland Eastern Shore
B.S. in Construction Management Technology
B.S. in Hospitality and Tourism Management
University of Maryland Global Campus
B.A. in Communication Studies
B.S. in Accounting
B.S. in Business Administration
 B.S. in Computer Networks and Cybersecurity
 B.S. in Cybersecurity Management and Policy
 B.S. in Digital Media and Web Technology
 B.S. in Human Resource Management
 B.S. in Information Systems Management
 B.S. In Investigative Forensics
 B.S. in Public Safety Administration
 B.S. in Software Development and Security
 B.T.P.S. in Biotechnology
 B.T.P.S. in Laboratory Management
 M.S. in Biotechnology
 M.S. in Health Care Administration
 M.S. in Information Technology
 M.S. in Management

References

External links
Official site

Bowie State University
Towson University
University of Baltimore
University of Maryland, Baltimore
University of Maryland, Baltimore County
University of Maryland, College Park
University of Maryland Eastern Shore
University of Maryland Global Campus
University System of Maryland
Two year upper class colleges
Salisbury University
Educational institutions established in 2000
Universities and colleges in Montgomery County, Maryland
2000 establishments in Maryland